Madeleine Gug (1913–1971) was a French film editor. She worked with Henri-Georges Clouzot on the 1955 film Les Diaboliques. She also collaborated on a number of occasions with Claude Autant-Lara.

Selected filmography
 The Inevitable Monsieur Dubois (1943)
 Love Story (1943)
 Six Hours to Lose (1946)
 Sylvie and the Ghost (1946)
 Devil in the Flesh (1947)
 Keep an Eye on Amelia (1949)
 Barry (1949)
 I Like Only You (1949)
 The Red Inn (1951)
 The Wages of Fear (1953)
 Good Lord Without Confession (1953)
 Les Diaboliques (1955)
 Lola Montès (1955)
 Marguerite de la nuit (1955)
 The Affair of the Poisons (1955)
 La Traversée de Paris (1956)
 Lovers of Paris (1957)
 The Gambler (1958)
 In Case of Adversity (1958)
 The Trip to Biarritz (1963)
 Enough Rope (1963)
 A Woman in White (1965)
 Two for the Road (1967)

References

Bibliography
 Susan Hayward. Les Diaboliques. University of Illinois Press, 2005.

External links

1913 births
1971 deaths
French film editors
Film people from Paris
French women film editors